The 2009 Real Salt Lake season was the fifth season of the team's existence. After clinching the eighth and final spot in the 2009 MLS Cup Playoffs, Real Salt Lake would go on to defeat the Los Angeles Galaxy in the 2009 MLS Cup. The team was the first team in MLS history to win the MLS Cup after finishing the regular season with a losing record (11–12–7).

Squad

First-team squad

As of July 15, 2009.

Out on loan

Club

Management

Other information

Competitions

Overall

Major League Soccer

Standings

Results summary

Matches

MLS regular season

March

April

May

June

July

August

September

October

MLS playoffs

U.S. Open Cup qualifying

References

External links 

2009 Schedule

Real Salt Lake seasons
Real Salt Lake
Real Salt Lake
Real Salt Lake
MLS Cup champion seasons